Ghanshyam Tiwari (born 19 December 1947) is an Indian politician who has served as the MLA of the Sanganer constituency, located in Rajasthan between 2013 and 2018. He is a member of the Bharatiya Janata Party. 6 time MLA Tiwari has been winning for the last three consecutive elections from the same constituency. He is one of the prominent leaders of Rajasthan who have played significant roles in the establishment of the Bharatiya Janata Party.

Minister Of Power

Minister of Education, Minister of Parliamentary Affairs

Minister of Food & Civil Supplies, Minister of Law & Justice

Position in BJP

Early life and education 
Ghanshyam Tiwari was born on 19 December 1947 in Sikar Rajasthan. While pursuing the bachelor's degree from Sri Kalyan Sanskrit College, Sikar, he was given the position of general secretary in the Students' Union of the college. After graduating from the Sanskrit college, he came to Jaipur for his L.L.B. In these years he was a member of the University Apex Body. He was also the organizer and Vice President of ABVP.

Political career 
During the emergency in 1975, Tiwari became a full-fledged politician. He fought against the dominating policies of the government. Tiwari got huge support from the people of Rajasthan and became a powerful voice during this period. Due to his fight against the central government, Tiwari was put in jail where he was brutally tortured. Then some national level activists like Jayaprakash Narayan and Atal Bihari Vajpayee started a movement against the government in defense of Tiwari. This was the turning point in Tiwari's political life. He got appreciated by many great leaders of that time and become a recognized face in Rajasthan.

Tiwari contested in Rajasthan assembly elections of 1980 from Sikar constituency and Won. He was consecutively Re-elected as MLA for 2 times, 1980–85 and 1985–89.

Role in BJP 
Tiwari was a member of the Janata Party. Due to internal conflicts, a few members separated from the Janata Party and created a new organization called Bharatiya Janata Party on April 6, 1980. Tiwari was one of the founders of the BJP in Rajasthan.

Achievements as minister 
Tiwari has served as the minister of various departments in the cabinet of Rajasthan government. He was the Power Minister in the Government of Bhairo Singh Shekhawat during July 1998 to November 1998. After few years, he was given multiple departments in Vasundhara Raje's government. Tiwari was heading primary and secondary education department, law and Justice Department, Parliamentary Affairs Department simultaneously during the period of 2003 to 2007. Tiwari made new policies in the department related to transfer and placements. He distributed free textbooks among the students, opened schools at every kilometer. There were more than 1.5 Lakh teachers appointed during his term. His work as the education minister was appreciated by the Supreme Court Of India. For the milestones achieved during his term, the Education department of Rajasthan has awarded the UNESCO Confucius Prize For Literacy.

References

External links 

Tiwari resigns from BJP
Rebel BJP MLA Ghanshyam Tiwari protests against Raje's occupation of government bungalow
Rajasthan rebel MLA Ghanshyam Tiwari writes to Amit Shah, says ‘Sack Raje in public interest’
Rebel BJP MLA Ghanshyam Tiwari, son float new party to contest Rajasthan election
Ghanshyam Tiwari takes on govt over EBC quota issue

Rajasthan MLAs 2013–2018
Living people
1947 births
People from Jaipur district
Bharatiya Janata Party politicians from Rajasthan
State cabinet ministers of Rajasthan
Rajasthan MLAs 1980–1985
Rajasthan MLAs 1985–1990
Rajasthan MLAs 1993–1998
Rajasthan MLAs 2003–2008
Rajasthan MLAs 2008–2013